B93 may refer to:
Sicilian Defence, Najdorf Variation, Encyclopaedia of Chess Openings code
 B93, a postcode district in the B postcode area
 Bundesstraße 93, a German road
 Gurktal Straße, an Austrian road
 The on-air brand name of numerous radio stations, including:
 CFOB-FM, Fort Frances, Ontario
 CJBZ-FM, Lethbridge, Alberta
 KBRK-FM, Brookings, South Dakota 
 KOSO, Modesto, California
 KZBT, Midland, Texas
 WBCT-FM, Grand Rapids, Michigan 
 WBFM, Sheboygan, Wisconsin
 WCYE, Rhinelander, Wisconsin 
 WFBC-FM, Greenville, South Carolina
 WYAB, Jackson, Mississippi (on 103.9 FM since August 28, 2008; rebranded as 103-9 WYAB)

B.93 may refer to :
 Boldklubben 1893, Danish football club